Oriel school may refer to:

 Oriel School System,  Jhang District, Pakistan
 Oriel High School, Crawley, England
 Oriel High School, Great Yarmouth, England
 Oriel Sixth Form, Crawley, England

See also
 Oriel (disambiguation)